Diedrich Coffee is a coffee company based in Irvine, CA. Its first coffee house in Orange County, California, was opened in 1972.

History

The history of the company started with Charlotte Diedrich inheriting a coffee plantation in Costa Rica in 1916. Her son, Carl Diedrich joined the business in 1946 and purchased a coffee plantation in Antigua, Guatemala, in 1966. The first coffeehouse, a roastery, opened in Newport Beach in 1972.

Diedrich Coffee, a neighborhood coffeehouse, was founded by Martin Diedrich in 1983.  He took over the retail, roasting and importing facets of the family business from retiring Carl. In September 1996, Diedrich Coffee went public.

The company bought rival chain Coffee People, which also held the franchise rights to Gloria Jean's Coffees in the United States, in July 1999. In June 2004, Martin Diedrich resigned his position at Diedrich Coffee.

In September 2006, Diedrich Coffee announced plans to close its company-owned retail stores under the Diedrich and Coffee People brands, with 40 locations being sold to rival Starbucks and reopened under that brand. The company continued as a roaster and wholesaler of coffee beans and as the franchisor of the Coffee People and Gloria Jean's brands. The company also retained ownership of Coffee People stores inside the Portland International Airport.

In 2009, Diedrich Coffee sold  its US Gloria Jean's franchises to the Australian-owned Gloria Jean’s Coffees International. As part of the deal, Diedrich retained the rights to use the Gloria Jean's brand in North America for wholesaling and Kuerig coffee pods.

On November 3, 2009, California-based Peet's Coffee announced that it was buying Diedrich. On December 8, 2009, Vermont-based Green Mountain Coffee Roasters Inc. trumped the offer from Peet's Coffee and agreed to buy Diedrich for $290 million.

See also
 List of coffeehouse chains

References

External links
Diedrich Coffee
Coffee People
Gloria Jean's

Restaurants established in 1972
Coffeehouses and cafés in the United States
Fast-food chains of the United States
Companies based in Irvine, California
Regional restaurant chains in the United States
Coffee brands
1972 establishments in California